Šar cheese is a hard cheese made in Gora, Opolje and Štrpce, located in the Šar Mountains of Kosovo. It is made of sheep and cow milk and usually added to salads and main dishes, pitas, served with bread or eaten alone. The hallmarks of the cheese are its saltiness, and the fact that it is a treat for any time of the day or year.

History 
The tradition of producing Šar cheese has been passed on to generations for centuries.  By the 1890s, the cheese became popular; the Serbian newspaper Carigradski glasnik of 28 July 1901 said that the cheese had overwhelmed the neighbouring markets because of its yellow fatty look and taste which had not been seen in other cheeses.

Traditionally, Šar cheese was made using sheep milk. One of the reasons why sheep milk was usually used was because cows were not able to climb the highland and reach the favorite grass and herbs which give Šar cheese its main characteristics. It is known that the main herb which impacts the aroma and taste of Šar cheese is dill, which is very common in the highlands over  altitude. After the people of the Šar region had begun to use cow milk for the cheese, they started to collect the dill herb for its use as an external ingredient during the production process, with the aim to preserve the original characteristics of the cheese. Centuries ago, there were vast numbers of sheep in the region, up to 100,000; today this number has fallen to 5,000.
  
The Šar cheese is different because the region is naturally rich in unique herbs and aromatic plants which results in a much richer, better-tasting milk. Even though the cheese is popular in its solid form, there is also a soft version of it. Either solid or soft, for decades the cheese was handmade at old wooden shepherds’ huts or in the homes of mountain village folks. Lately however, companies have launched industrial production lines of this product.

Production 

The cheese is traditionally made in Gora, Opolje and Štrpce.

According to centuries-old recipes, Šar cheese is mostly made from sheep and cow milk, and it is the kind of milk which determines the cheese's fat content. The production process evolved from a traditional to a more modern way of production during the years. This happened because of two major reasons, which are: 
Prevention of diseases – Pasteurization process 
Industrial production of complementary ingredients

In the traditional way of production sheep milk was retained in its original temperature and not pasteurized.  Later, in the more modern way the milk was pasteurized before used for cheese production. After pasteurization, the milk gets a dose of yeast which needs which is required for the fermentation process. Again, in the traditional method this yeast was taken from sheep gallstone whereas nowadays it is bought ready to use. After fermentation, the milk is poured into a diaper and compressed to release the liquid Whey remains of the fermentation process. The milk (or pre-cheese) stays in the diaper until it gains a strong and solid state and also starts to change its color from white to light yellow. After that, the cheese is taken out and stays for a few days on racks, in closed door places with low temperature. Finally, it is broken down in pieces (by hand), salted water with Dill is prepared and both are stacked into plastic jars for shipping. An interesting fact is that even the type of wood used in constructing the racks affects the aroma and quality of the cheese. For example, one type of wood which is known to be neutral, doesn't impact the aroma of the cheese and is used most to construct those racks is called Pinus peuce.

Total production of Šar cheese is about 25 tones per year which is mainly produced in the region of Dragaš from sheep and cow milk. Main characteristics related to Šar cheese is availability during all year, quality, saltiness and equal presentation in all regions of Kosovo. While mostly produced in private households, the past decade has seen the rise of industrial Šar cheese manufacturers. The majority of these entrepreneurs operate in and around Prizren, such as ABI Industry, a fruit and vegetable processing company which also makes this popular cheese. There is no significant difference between the traditional and industrial method of Šar cheese production. The industrial version is made from pasteurized milk which is then fermented. Traditionally prepared cheese cannot be eaten until it has thoroughly absorbed the salt and has ripened, while industrially produced cheese is sent to the market after two weeks and can be eaten immediately. Veterans in industrial Šar cheese production are the above-mentioned ABI and another Prizren factory – Sharri – which has been in this business for a decade.
Šar cheese is mostly sold across the region of the Western Balkans. However, since people from Kosovo live and work in Western Europe – for example in Germany and Switzerland – cheese manufacturers are visiting food fairs in these countries, hoping to enter the Western European markets.

Flavors 
There are two main variants of Šar cheese: Traditional (Hard) and Soft. The main difference between the two is its state, although saltiness and smell can also vary. The soft variant has only later appeared whereas the traditional type has been produced in the same way since the beginning and is also the preferred flavor of the two.

Different kinds of cheese similar to Šar cheese are White cheese and Cypriot Halloumi.

Consumption 

The consumption of Šar cheese is dominant in Prizren, Ferizaj, and Prishtina even though it is consumed as well in other regions. Information shows that the traditional kind of Šar cheese is bought more than the soft variety because of consumers’ preference of hard over soft Šar cheese. The most bought brand of Šar cheese in Kosovo is called “Sharri”.

Quantities of Šar cheese consumed per month vary from 2–3 to 10 kg. Šar cheese is also popular among restaurants with approximately 43,000 kg consumed per year.

Usually original Šar cheese is sold in wooden buckets or plastic buckets in bigger quantities making the product specific. Price of sheep Šar cheese might be between 5 and 7 Euro per kilogram while for cow Šar cheese is around 4 Euros per kilogram. Usually regular consumers purchase higher quantities in wooden and plastic buckets from 5 to 20 kilograms
The reason of the difference in price between sheep and cow Šar cheese is the higher quality which is achieved by a higher percentage of fat in sheep milk. This makes the Šar cheese produced by sheep milk the preferred flavor also because in the original days there was only sheep milk used.

See also 
Cuisine of Kosovo

Annotations

References 

Cow's-milk cheeses
Albanian cheeses
Serbian cheeses
Šar Mountains
Sheep's-milk cheeses
Mixed-milk cheeses